Situations may refer to:
Situations (essay series), 1947 essays by Jean-Paul Sartre  
Situations – The Very Best Of Cetu Javu, 2009 compilation album
"Situations" (Cetu Javu song), 1988 single 
 Situations EP, 2007 EP by Escape the Fate